Love Toy is a 1968  soft-core exploitation film, produced and directed by Doris Wishman. It stars Pat Happel, Uta Erickson (billed as Willa Mist) and Larry Hunter (billed as Vic Lester)

Plot

Marcus (Larry Hunter) loses all his belongings to Alex (Bernard Marcel) at a game of Gin Rummy. Alex offers to drop all debts in return for one night with Marcus' teenage daughter Chris (Pat Happel). Marcus agrees reluctantly but when he tries to intervene, Alex and his wife Mary (Uta Erickson) bind him to a chair. She stays behind to keep an eye on him.

Alex forces Chris to assume the roles of his childhood cat 'Samuel' (she has to lap up milk from a bowl while nude), his mother (she has to nurse him), his wife, his child (he spanks her), his horse, and finally his mistress.

Therewhile, Mary seems to be burning up in her green dress. She performs an erotic dance for Marcus (who seems to do nothing more than moan in agony or pain throughout most of the film), lapses into a memory of her mother having intercourse with a lover while she was a girl, and finally masturbates while watching Alex and Chris pretend they are lovers.

The film closes on a threesome between Alex, Chris and Mary, Marcus choking Chris to death on her own night gown and finally Chris's awakening from the bad dream she just had. As well as one final surprise...

Cast

 Bernard Marcel (Alex)
 Pat Happel (Chris)
 Uta Erickson (Mary, billed as Willa Mist)
 Larry Hunter (Marcus, billed as Vic Lester)

See also
List of American films of 1968

References

External links

1960 films
1960s exploitation films
Films directed by Doris Wishman
1960s pornographic films
1960s English-language films
1960s American films